Michael Carson Lennox is a Northern Irish film director.

Biography
Born and raised in County Antrim, Northern Ireland, Lennox was inspired by cinema from an early age and began to make plans for a career as a filmmaker. In 2008, he made his first short film, called Rip and the Preacher. The film was shown at the Californian Cinequest Film Festival, the LA Shorts Fest and a lot of other film festivals around the world. In 2010 Lennox made his Television debut with a 30-minute drama, called Eclipse, starring Andrew Buchan. Eclipse was an episode for the 8th season of the British TV series Coming Up.

Lennox gained a place on the Master of Arts in Fiction directing-course at the National Film and Television School in Beaconsfield. His work at the university included the short film The Back of Beyond. It was screened as part of the BAFTA NFTS Stars of Tomorrow event and won the Royal Television Society Student Television Award in the Post Graduate Section. The film also won the Pianifica Award and the Junior Jury Award at the Locarno Film Festival in 2012 and was nominated for the European Film Award.

Furthermore, Lennox collaborated on the feature film Hives, which was selected for the San Sebastian Film Festival and was the result of a co-production project between five European film academies.

In 2014 Lennox returned to his home in Northern Ireland where he directed the short film Boogaloo and Graham, which had its world premiere at the Toronto International Film Festival. In 2015, Boogaloo and Graham won a BAFTA Award for Best British Short Film and was nominated for the Academy Award for Best Short Film, Live Action. Lennox's debut feature A Patch of Fog, starring Stephen Graham and Conleth Hill, was released in 2015.

In 2017, 2018, and 2021 Lennox directed all three series of the Channel 4 television sitcom Derry Girls.

Filmography

Awards and nominations
2012: Pianifica Award for The Back of Beyond at the Locarno International Film Festival
2012: Junior Jury Award for The Back of Beyond in the Leopards of Tomorrow - International Competition at the Locarno International Film Festival
2012: Nominated for the Golden Pardino - Leopards of Tomorrow for The Back of Beyond in the International Competition at the Locarno International Film Festival
2012: Nominated for the Best Short Film Award for The Back of Beyond at the European Film Awards
2013: Best “ExYU generation Next” award for Hives at the Skena Up Festival in Pristina
2015: Nominated for the IFTA Award in the category Best Short Filmfor Boogaloo and Graham at the Irish Film and Television Awards
2015: Nominated for the Crystal Bear in the category Generation Kplus - Best Short Film for Boogaloo and Graham at the Berlin International Film Festival
2015: BAFTA Award for Boogaloo and Graham in the category Best British Short Film at the British Academy Film Awards
2015: Nominated for the Oscar in the category Best Short Film, Live Action for Boogaloo and Graham at the US-american Academy Awards

References

External links
 

Living people
Year of birth missing (living people)
People from County Antrim
Film directors from Northern Ireland
Television directors from Northern Ireland
English-language film directors
Alumni of the National Film and Television School
People educated at Antrim Grammar School